The 1982 Kvalserien was the eighth edition of the Kvalserien. It determined which two teams of the participating ones would play in the 1982–83 Elitserien season and which two teams would play in the 1982–83 Swedish Division 1 season.

Tournament

External links
Tournament on hockeyarchives.info

Kvalserien
Kval